Philips Hue is a line of color-changing LED lamps and white bulbs which can be controlled wirelessly. The Philips Hue line of bulbs was the first smart bulb of its kind on the market. The lamps are currently created and manufactured by Signify N.V., formerly the Philips Lighting division of Royal Philips N.V.

Products

Operation 
The Hue Bridge is the central controller of the lighting system which allows the bulbs to "communicate" with Apple HomeKit and the app. In 2016, Philips released a new square shaped v2 bridge with increased memory and processor speed which replaced the round v1 bridge. The first-generation bridge received a final software update in April 2020 and disabled support from the Philips web servers. Functionality like grouping lights into rooms and scheduling scenes that depended on Philips servers to pack the instructions into a form the bridge executed could no longer be created. Early adopters were forced to buy a V2 bridge in order to use their light bulbs other than as configured before the server cutoff, a limitation not typically amenable to the technologically adventurous tinkerers who best typify the early adopters of new home automation products.

The Hue system was released in October 2012 as an Apple Store exclusive and was marketed as the first iOS controlled lighting appliance. Products released prior to 2019 use the Zigbee Light Link protocol, a compatible subset of Zigbee 3.0, to communicate, while lighting products released after 2019 use either Bluetooth, or Zigbee 3.0. Smart switches, motion detectors, and other accessory devices e.g. Hue HDMI sync, used the Zigbee Home Automation protocol but now also use Zigbee 3.0. Hue system components can be controlled via any internet device, but most typically  smartphone apps over cellular or WiFi networks, or a Home automation voice command interface. Commands are delivered to the bridge via a wired Ethernet connection which transmits the commands to the devices over the Zigbee mesh network. The initial system had bulbs capable of producing up to 600 lumens while the newer systems have bulbs that produce up to 1600 lumens.

In July 2018, an outdoor version of the Philips Hue suite was introduced, and in October 2018 a suite of entertainment-focused, free-standing light fittings. In January 2019 they announced outdoor sensors and lights.

Color ranges 
There are three different Philips Hue color types available: White, White Ambiance, and White and Color Ambiance. All bulbs are dimmable, but each type is designed for a different use. The White bulbs produce a white light with a set color temperature of 2700 K, while the White Ambiance bulbs can produce a range of color temperatures between 2200 K and 6500 K, from a warm soft white to a bright day light. The White and Color Ambiance range features the same adjustable white light, and can produce 16 million colors.

Bulbs with Bluetooth 
Since June 2019, all Philips hue bulbs are available with Bluetooth. With the addition of Bluetooth, a Philips Hue Bridge is no longer necessary for the most basic operation, though the bridge enables many important features. The Bluetooth lamps can be directly operated with the special Philips Hue Bluetooth app. The Bluetooth bulbs are still compatible with the bridge, but a bridge is not absolutely necessary. The use of bluetooth bulbs is limited to a maximum of 10 lamps with a maximum distance of 30 feet, between the lamp and smartphone.

However, the Hue Bluetooth smartphone app requires enabling the location services and will not function without location services.

Security concern
A security flaw in the product was discovered and fixed, then disclosed in 2016. The bulbs were able to be remotely controlled over the Internet by simulated security engineers using inexpensive equipment. In the proof-of-concept, researchers were able to remotely control light bulbs using a nearby car or a drone flying outside a window within . The flaw was reported to Philips and fixed prior to being publicly revealed.

Reception
In an article in Forbes, Seth Porges called Phillips Hue the "best product of 2012". PC Magazine reviewed the white variation and named it as an editors' choice and said it was bright and affordable and had many features.

Gallery

References

External links

 

Philips products
Lighting
Home automation
Home automation companies
Proprietary hardware